Midland is a community in Springfield Parish, Kings County in the Canadian province of New Brunswick.

History

Notable people

See also
List of communities in New Brunswick

Neighbouring communities
 Norton
 Keirsteadville

Communities in Kings County, New Brunswick